is a railway station in the city of Kosai, Shizuoka Prefecture, Japan, operated by the third sector Tenryū Hamanako Railroad.

Lines
Ōmori Station is served by the Tenryū Hamanako Line, and is located 65.0 kilometers from the starting point of the line at Kakegawa Station.

Station layout
The station has one side platform serving a single bi-sexual track. The station is unattended.

Adjacent stations

|-
!colspan=5|Tenryū Hamanako Railroad

History
Ōmori Station is newest station on the Tenryū Hamanako Line and opened on April 1, 2009.

Passenger statistics
In fiscal 2016, the station was used by an average of 24 passengers daily (boarding passengers only).

Surrounding area
Japan National Route 301
Kosai Junior High School

See also
 List of Railway Stations in Japan

External links

  Tenryū Hamanako Railroad Station information 
 

Railway stations in Shizuoka Prefecture
Railway stations in Japan opened in 2009
Stations of Tenryū Hamanako Railroad
Kosai, Shizuoka